V'iacheslav Kostanda (born 17 May 1963) is a Ukrainian water polo player. He competed in the men's tournament at the 1996 Summer Olympics.

References

External links
 

1963 births
Living people
Ukrainian male water polo players
Olympic water polo players of Ukraine
Water polo players at the 1996 Summer Olympics
Sportspeople from Mariupol